Morgan Olson is an American company that produces aluminum walk-in vans. It was founded in 1946 on Long Island, New York, by Jimmy Olson, and is currently located in Sturgis, Michigan. Previously owned by Northrop Grumman and doing business as Grumman Olson for several decades, the company was then taken over by a group of senior managers. In 2003, Grumman Olson was purchased by the American company JBPCO, who also owned Morgan Corp., the then-largest manufacturer of truck bodies in the United States. Grumman Olson was renamed Morgan Olson in 2004.

Morgan Olson's leading competitor is Utilimaster Corporation.

History

The idea for the first aluminum walk-in van was originated by Walter Heingartner, owner of Kinney Motors Chevrolet in Brooklyn, NY.  Heingartner was friends with Jimmy Olson, then Commissioner of the New York State Liquor Authority. Olson had no truck experience, but knowing there were ten independent laundry companies in Brooklyn alone, he saw a market. He also knew someone who could build it, "Jake" Swirbul, one of Grumman's founders. Grumman had no experience building commercial truck bodies. However, they decided to move forward with the concept and Grumman Aircraft Engineering was scheduled to produce the vehicle beginning in 1939. The concept was shelved due to the onset of World War II.

After the war, Olson and three partners formulated J.B.E. Olson Corporation on Coney Island Avenue in Brooklyn.

The company grew over the next few decades. The company purchased the Sturgis, MI facility, its current headquarters, in 1963.

In 1984, Grumman Olson was awarded the largest contract in its history. The United States Postal Service (USPS) awarded Grumman Olson a contract worth over one billion dollars. Over 150,000 Grumman LLVs were produced, of which the majority are in operation today.

After changes in ownership in the 1990s, Grumman Olson was faced with a declining market, and eventually declared bankruptcy in 2001. The company was purchased by JBPCO, a parent company whose sales are nearly one billion annually, in 2003. At that time the name of the company was changed to Morgan Olson.

Today, Morgan Olson produces walk-in vans, dry freight box truck vans, and cargo van upfittings.

Products

 1946-19?? Olson Kargo King
 Olson/Grumman Kurb Side
 Olson/Grumman Kurb Van
 Olson/Grumman Kurb Van King
 195? - 1990 Olson/Grumman Kurbmaster
 Olson/Grumman Junior Kurbmaster
 1955-196? Olson Olsonette (small, class 1)
 1965-1990 Grumman P-500/600/800 (only sold to UPS after 1980)
 1986-1994 Grumman LLV
 1990-20?? Grumman/Morgan Olson Route Star (7,600-14,000 lb GVWR)
 1991-?? Grumman Olson Freight Star (Van/cutaway version of Route Star

Location
Morgan Olson's home plant and corporate offices are located in Sturgis Michigan. Loudon, Tennessee became home of the second production facility in 2015. The third and newest production facility, beginning operations in 2020, is located in Ringgold, Virginia. With over 900,000 square feet, the Ringgold facility is the largest of the three plants.

References

Vans
Motor vehicle manufacturers based in Michigan
Vehicle manufacturing companies established in 1946
1946 establishments in New York City